PT Elang Mahkota Teknologi Tbk, trading as Emtek, is an Indonesian technology, telecommunication and media conglomerate headquartered in Jakarta.  it is Indonesia's second largest media company. Currently, the company is headed by Alvin Widarta Sariaatmadja as its president director.

History 
The company was established in 1983 as PT Elang Mahkota Komputer as a distributor of Compaq computers. In 1998, PT Elang Mahkota Komputer renamed itself into PT Elang Mahkota Teknologi.
On 9 August 2004, the company launched a local television station – O Channel, along with the MRA Media Group. In 2007, Emtek took full control of the station. In 2008, the group took control of Surya Citra Media (SCTV). In November 2011, Emtek launched a subscription TV operator, named NexMedia. Emtek as an Official Broadcaster of the 2018 Asian Games for the Indonesian Olympic Committee.

Corporate governance 
As of 28 February 2021, Emtek ownership is as follows:
 Eddy Kusnadi Sariaatmadja (24.91%)
 Fofo Sariaatmadja (5.38%)
 Susanto Suwarto (12.61%)
 PT Adikarsa Sarana (11.53%)
 Anthoni Salim (9.08%)
 Piet Yaury (8.84%)
 PT Prima Visualindo (8.14%)
 Archipelago Investment Pte. Ltd (8.06%)
 shareholder (20.13%)

Executives 
Eddy Kusnadi Sariaatmadja (President Commissioner)
Sutanto Hartono (President Director)
Alvin Widarta Sariaatmadja (Director)
Yuslinda Nasution (Director: Solution Operation)
Susanto Suwarto (Commissioner)

Business units

Media 
 Surya Citra Media
 SCTV
 Indosiar
 Vidio
 Nex Parabola
 Screenplay Productions
 Indonesia Entertainmen Group
 Indonesia Entertainmen Studio
 Indonesia Entertainmen Produksi
 SinemArt
 Screenplay Films
 Screenplay Infinite Films
 DreamToon
 Digital Rantai Maya
 
 
 
 Stream Entertainment
 KapanLagi Youniverse
 KapanLagi.com
 Liputan6.com
 Bintang.com
 Bola.com
 Bola.net
 Famous.id
 Dream.co.id
 Brilio.net
 Fimela.com
 Vemale.com
 Merdeka.com
 Otosia.com
 Sooperboy.com
 Moji
 Karir.com
 Lakupon
 Bukalapak (23,93% via Kreatif Karya Media)
 Rumah.com
 Oto.com
 Reservasi.com
 HijUp
 Bobobobo
 BrideStory
 Home Tester Club
 Kudo
 SuitMedia
 Elang Sejahtera Mandiri
 EDIK
 Doku
 Media Komunika Teknologi
 KlikDokter.com
 Klik-Apotek.com
 Eye Indonesia

Connectivity and others 
 Bitnet Komunikasindo
 Elang Medika Corpora
 EMC Tangerang
 Rumah Sakit EMC Sentul
 Graha Mitra Insani
 Surya Cipta Medika
 Primedia Solusi Pratama
 Elang Graha Propertindo
 Indosurya Menara Bersama
 Elang Media Visitama
 Super Bank Indonesia
 Binary Ventura Indonesia
 Akademi Televisi Indonesia

CSR 
 Yayasan Pundi Amal Peduli Kasih
 Yayasan Puteri Indonesia

References

External links
 

 
2010 initial public offerings
Companies based in Jakarta
Companies listed on the Indonesia Stock Exchange
Conglomerate companies of Indonesia
Indonesian companies established in 1983
Technology companies established in 1983
Technology companies of Indonesia
Telecommunications companies established in 1983
Telecommunications companies of Indonesia
Holding companies established in 1983